Project Kahu was a major upgrade for the A-4K Skyhawk attack aircraft operated by the Royal New Zealand Air Force (RNZAF) in the mid-1980s. (The project was named after the Māori-language name for the New Zealand swamp harrier.)

History

In 1986, the RNZAF initiated this project to improve the capabilities of its Douglas A-4 Skyhawk fleet. The upgrade included the installation of a Westinghouse AN/APG-66 radar optimized for maritime tracking, HOTAS controls and a glass cockpit (2 large CRT screens), MIL-STD 1553B databus, Litton Industries LN-93 inertial navigation system, Ferranti 4510 wide-angle HUD, the Vinten airborne video recording system, the General Instrument ALR-66 radar warning receiver, and a Tracor ALR-39 chaff/flare dispenser.

The contract covered the upgrade of all 22 of the RNZAF's Skyhawk fleet, which at the time comprised the surviving 12 (of 14) K-model aircraft of the RNZAF's original order plus the 10 G-models acquired from the Royal Australian Navy in 1984. However, only 21 were completed as one  (NZ6210) was lost in 1989 before it was upgraded.

Parts of the wings were reskinned and some structural elements rebuilt, and the aircraft wiring replaced. Because of advances in miniaturization, it was possible to incorporate these additional electronics items entirely within the fuselage without requiring the use of the dorsal hump. The Kahu-modified Skyhawk could be recognized by a blade-like ILS aerial antenna on the leading edge of the vertical stabilizer. The aircraft also received armament upgrades including the capability to fire AIM-9L Sidewinders, AGM-65 Mavericks and GBU-16 Paveway II laser-guided bombs.

TA-4K NZ6254 was the first aircraft to be completed and undertook an extensive test programme conducted by Flight Lieutenant Steve Moore, who had recently become only the second RNZAF pilot to complete and graduate from the Empire Test Pilot School in the United Kingdom. The programme was completed in June 1991 when the final aircraft, NZ6202, was returned to the RNZAF.

The cost of the project was NZ$140 million and gave the RNZAF Skyhawks the electronic “eyes and ears” of a modern fighter aircraft such as the F-16 Fighting Falcon or F/A-18 Hornet.

Aftermath 
The RNZAF withdrew the Skyhawks from service in 2001 and they were put into storage awaiting sale.

Draken International signed an agreement with the New Zealand government in 2012 to purchase eight as well as various other equipment and accessories. The remaining aircraft were donated to museums including the Air Force Museum of New Zealand, Fleet Air Arm Museum (Australia) and Museum of Transport & Technology.

See also
 A-4AR Fightinghawk
 A-4SU Super Skyhawk

References

KiwiAircraft.com: McDonnell Douglas (T)A-4K Skyhawk

External links
 FlightGlogalImages.com Cut-away drawings
 RNZAF Proboards.com Project Kahu
 redkiwi.weebly.com - Kahu, the A-4K Skyhawk Story.

Douglas A-4 Skyhawk
Royal New Zealand Air Force
KAHU